Rechon Malik "Leaky" Black (born June 14, 1999) is an American college basketball player for the North Carolina Tar Heels of the Atlantic Coast Conference (ACC).

College career
Black, raised in Concord, North Carolina, committed to coach Roy Williams and North Carolina as a high school sophomore. After a shortened freshman campaign due to an ankle injury, Black entered the starting lineup in his sophomore season for the Tar Heels.

As a senior, Black became one of the top defensive players in the ACC, earning conference all-defensive team honors at the close of the regular season. Black was a part of a Tar Heel starting lineup that each averaged big minutes and led the eighth-seeded Tar Heels to an unexpected Final Four berth in the 2022 NCAA tournament. In the semifinal against rival Duke, Black held Duke freshman AJ Griffin to 1–7 shooting for 6 points to help secure the win.

Career statistics

College

|-
| style="text-align:left;"| 2018–19
| style="text-align:left;"| North Carolina
| 23 || 0 || 10.3 || .469 || .417 || .857 || 2.1 || 1.2 || .6 || .2 || 2.5
|-
| style="text-align:left;"| 2019–20
| style="text-align:left;"| North Carolina
| 32 || 31 || 29.7 || .359 || .254 || .696 || 5.0 || 2.6 || 1.3 || .8 || 6.5
|-
| style="text-align:left;"| 2020–21
| style="text-align:left;"| North Carolina
| 29 || 27 || 27.6 || .367 || .222 || .692 || 4.9 || 2.4 || 1.2 || .3 || 5.6
|-
| style="text-align:left;"| 2021–22
| style="text-align:left;"| North Carolina
| 38 || 38 || 29.7 || .466 || .333 || .868 || 4.3 || 2.7 || .9 || .7 || 4.9
|-
| style="text-align:left;"| 2022–23
| style="text-align:left;"| North Carolina
| 33 || 33 || 32.1 || .411 || .326 || .702 || 4.8 || 1.5 || 1.3 || .8 || 7.3
|- class="sortbottom"
| style="text-align:center;" colspan="2"| Career
|| 155 || 129 || 26.9 || .401 || .296 || .735 || 4.7 || 2.2 || 1.1 || .6 || 5.5

Personal life
Black has been open about his struggles with anxiety and his coping strategies that have helped him control it. He earned his nickname, which comes from his middle name "Malik," from his grandmother.

References

External links
North Carolina Tar Heels bio
College stats @ sports-reference.com

1999 births
Living people
American men's basketball players
Basketball players from North Carolina
Montverde Academy alumni
North Carolina Tar Heels men's basketball players
People from Concord, North Carolina
Shooting guards
Small forwards